Israeli wine is produced by hundreds of wineries, ranging in size from small boutique enterprises to large companies producing over ten million bottles per year. 

Wine has been produced in the Land of Israel since biblical times. Wine was exported to Rome during the Roman period, but under the Muslim rulers the production was virtually wiped out. Under the Crusaders, winemaking was temporarily revived.

The modern Israeli wine industry was founded by Baron Edmond James de Rothschild, owner of the Bordeaux estate Château Lafite-Rothschild. Today, Israeli winemaking takes place in five vine-growing regions: Galil (Galilee, including the Golan Heights), the region most suited for viticulture due to its high elevation, cool breezes, marked day and night temperature changes and rich, well-drained soils; the Judean Hills, surrounding the city of Jerusalem; Shimshon (Samson), located between the Judean Hills and the Coastal Plain; the Negev, a semi-arid desert region, where drip irrigation has made grape growing possible; and the Sharon plain near the Mediterranean coast and just south of Haifa, surrounding the towns of Zichron Ya'akov and Binyamina, which is the largest grape growing area in Israel.

In 2011, Israeli wine exports totaled over $26.7 million. As of 2012, Israel had 12,355 acres of vineyards.

History

Ancient and Classic era

Viticulture has existed in the land of Israel since biblical times. In the book of Deuteronomy, the fruit of the vine was listed as one of the seven blessed species of fruit found in the land of Israel(Deut. 8:8). The location of Israel along a historic wine trading route between Mesopotamia and Egypt brought winemaking knowledge and influence to the area. Wine played a significant role in the religion of the early Israelites with images of grape growing, harvesting and winemaking often being used to illustrate religious ideals. In Roman times, wine from Israel was exported to Rome with the most sought after wines being vintage, dated with the name of the winemaker inscribed on the amphora.

Middle Ages
Winemaking, limited under Islamic rule, was temporarily revived in the Crusader states from around 1100 to 1300 but the return of Islamic rule and the subsequent Jewish Diaspora extinguished the industry once again.

Modern

Ottoman and British periods
In 1848, a rabbi in Jerusalem founded the first documented winery in modern times but this establishment was short lived. In 1870, the first Jewish agricultural college, Mikveh Israel, was founded and featured a course on viticulture. The root of the modern Israeli wine industry can be traced to the late 19th century when the French Baron Edmond de Rothschild, owner of the Bordeaux estate Château Lafite-Rothschild, began importing French grape varieties and technical know how to the region. In 1882, he helped establish Carmel Winery with vineyards and wine production facilities in Rishon LeZion and Zikhron Ya'akov near Haifa. Still in operation today, Carmel is the largest producer of Israeli wine and has been at the forefront of many technical and historical advances in both winemaking and Israeli history.  One of the first telephones in Israel was installed at Carmel and the country's first Prime Minister, David Ben-Gurion, worked in Carmel's cellars in his youth.

After Israeli independence
For most of its history in the modern era, the Israeli wine industry was based predominantly on the production of Kosher wines which were exported worldwide to Jewish communities. The quality of these wines were varied, with many being produced from high-yielding vineyards that valued quantity over quality. Many of these wines were also somewhat sweet. Today's wine production in Israel comes from grape varieties traced to French varieties.

In November 2015 the European Union determined that settlement products could not use the label "Made in Israel". In July 2019 the Federal Court of Canada, following up on a complaint of false labelling made by David Kattenberg, a son of Holocaust survivors, ruled that characterizing wines produced in Israeli settlements as 'Israeli' was "false, misleading and deceptive." Kattenberg's original complaint had been accepted by the Canadian Food Inspection Agency (CFIA), only to be overruled within hours, with the CFIA affirming that the Canada–Israel Free Trade Agreement (CIFTA) overrode domestic consumer protection laws.

The Golan Heights, occupied by Israel since the Six-Day War in 1967, are located northeast of Israel proper, though Israel considers it a sub-region of the Galilee. The legal status in international law of the Golan Heights has resulted in controversy on the export market. In one example, following domestic demand for kosher wine, a number of Golan Heights wines were marketed by Systembolaget, Sweden's state-owned monopoly alcohol retailer, as "Made in Israel" on shelves and in the sales catalogue. Following customer complaints and consultation with Sweden's foreign ministry, Systembolaget changed the shelf labelling to read, "Made in Israeli-occupied Syrian territories." However this prompted further complaints, from some customers and a Member of Parliament. Systembolaget's solution was to simply remove all reference to the product's country of origin on shelves and in catalogues, classifying the wine as of "other origins." The actual bottles remained unchanged throughout the controversy, and carried the producer's English-language labels.

On 12 February 2013, Der Spiegel reported that Israel falsely labels products from Golan as "made in Israel", mentioning wine as one example.

In June 2019 the Advocate general of the European Court of Justice set forth his advisory legal opinion that a decision made by a French court in 2018, which waived the requirement to identify the origin of Israeli wines in the West Bank, was invalid. A binding decision was deferred to November 12, 2019, at which date the court confirmed that retailers must specify in their labelling when selling foodstuffs if they come from the occupied territories, including East Jerusalem, and whether they are produced in an Israeli settlement.

In 2020, the Netherlands Food and Consumer Product Safety Authority warned the Christian Zionist organisation "Christenen voor Israël" for selling wines produced in Kiryat Arba (near Hebron) with the designation "Made in an Israeli village in Judea and Samaria", already having been changed from "Made in Israel".

See also 
 Economy of Israel
 History of wine
 Israeli cuisine
 Kosher wine
 Palestinian wine
 Wine in the Middle East

References

Further reading 
 Ben-Joseph, Michael, The Bible of Israeli Wines, Moshav Ben Shemen, Modan Publishing House, (2002) 
 Rogov, Daniel, Rogov's Guides to Israeli & World Kosher Wines 2011, The Toby Press LLC, (2011)

External links 
 Israel Wine Producers' Association
 A Long History of Wine, Israel Ministry of Foreign Affairs
 The Kosher Wine Society
 ISRAEL’S WINE INDUSTRY (2012)// The Israel Export & International Cooperation Institute
 FAST FACTS/ ISRAELI WINE (2016)
 Israel's wine regions

 
Israeli cuisine